The 2020–21 LIU Sharks men's basketball team represented Long Island University during the 2020–21 NCAA Division I men's basketball season. The Sharks are led by fourth-year head coach Derek Kellogg, and play their home games at the Steinberg Wellness Center as members of the Northeast Conference (NEC).

Previous season 
The Sharks finished the 2019–20 season 15–18, 9–9 in NEC play to finish in a tie for fifth place. They defeated Fairleigh Dickinson in the quarterfinals of the NEC tournament before losing in the semifinals to Robert Morris.

Roster

Schedule and results

|-
!colspan=9 style=| Regular season

 

 

Source

References

LIU Sharks men's basketball seasons
LIU
LIU
LIU